Martha Rial (born 1961) is an independent photographer based in Pittsburgh, PA.  She is the winner of 1998 Pulitzer Prize for Spot News Photography her photographs of Rwandan and Burundian refugees.

Life
She is a native of the Pittsburgh suburb of Murrysville, Pennsylvania.

She graduated from the Art Institute of Pittsburgh and Ohio University with a BFA in 1998.

She was a staff photographer at the Ft. Pierce Tribune, and the Journal Newspapers in Alexandria, Virginia.  In 1994, she became a staff photographer at the Pittsburgh Post-Gazette. Rial also worked as a senior photojournalist at the St Petersburg Times (now the Tampa Bay Times) from 2006 to 2009.

In 2005, she had a gallery show at The Mattress Factory.

Awards
 1998 Pulitzer Prize for Spot News Photography
 1998 National Journalism Award winners, Scripps Howard Foundation

Works
Pittsburgh Post-Gazette pulitzer work on Rwanda.
"Homework, no home", St. Petersburg Times
"Off Stage: On Hartwood Grounds", Pittsburgh Cross Currents
"Martha Rial: Trek of Tears", The 1998 Pulitzer Prize Winners
"For the birds", Michael Pestel, Pittsburgh 2006
"Pittsburgh Marchers' Message", Common Dreams

References

External links 
 

1961 births
American photographers
Ohio University alumni
Living people
Pulitzer Prize for Photography winners
Pittsburgh Post-Gazette people
American women photographers
People from Murrysville, Pennsylvania
21st-century American women